Speke is an English surname. Notable people with the surname include:

George Speke (c.1530–1584), English politician
George Speke (1623–1689), English politician
Sir George Speke, 2nd Baronet (1653–1683), English politician
Hugh Speke (1656–c.1724), English writer and agitator
Sir Hugh Speke, 1st Baronet (died 1661), English politician
John Hanning Speke (1827–1864), English explorer and army officer 
John Speke (1442–1518), English sheriff

See also
Speke (disambiguation)

English-language surnames